Neam "Nim" Chimpsky (November 19, 1973 – March 10, 2000) was a chimpanzee and the subject of an extended study of animal language acquisition at Columbia University. The project was led by Herbert S. Terrace with the linguistic analysis headed up by psycholinguist Thomas Bever. Within the context of a scientific study, Chimpsky was named as a pun on linguist Noam Chomsky, who posits that humans are "wired" to develop language.

As part of a study intended to challenge Chomsky's thesis that only humans have language, beginning at two weeks old, Nim was raised by a family in a home environment by human surrogate parents. The surrogate parents already had a human child of their own. At the age of two Nim was removed from his surrogate parents, the familiar surrounding of their home and brought to Columbia University due to perceived behavioral difficulties. The project was similar to an earlier study by R. Allen and Beatrix Gardner in which another chimpanzee, Washoe, was raised like a human child. After reviewing the results, Terrace concluded that Nim, who at this point was housed at Columbia University, mimicked symbols of the American Sign Language from his teachers in order to get a reward but did not understand the language nor could he create sentences; Nim used random patterns until receiving a reward. Mainly, Terrace claimed that he had noticed that Nim mimicked the signs used moments before by his teacher, which Terrace, by his own words, had not noticed throughout the duration of the entire study but only moments before thinking of greenlighting the study as a success. Terrace further argued that all ape-language studies, including Project Nim, were based on misinformation from the chimps, which he also only noticed and examined in such a manner at and after said moment of realization. Terrace's work remains controversial today, with no clear consensus among psychologists and cognitive scientists regarding the extent to which great apes can learn language.

Project Nim

Project Nim was an attempt to go further than Project Washoe. Terrace and his colleagues aimed to use more thorough experimental techniques, and the intellectual discipline of the experimental analysis of behavior, so that the linguistic abilities of the apes could be put on a more secure footing.

Roger Fouts wrote:

Attention was particularly focused on Nim's ability to make different responses to different sequences of signs and to emit different sequences in order to communicate different meanings. However, the results, according to Fouts, were not as impressive as had been reported from the Washoe project. Terrace, however, was skeptical of Project Washoe and, according to the critics, went to great lengths to discredit it.

While Nim did learn 125 signs, Terrace concluded that he had not acquired anything the researchers were prepared to designate worthy of the name "language" (as defined by Noam Chomsky) although he had learned to repeat his trainers' signs in appropriate contexts. Language is defined as a "doubly articulated" system, in which signs are formed for objects and states and then combined syntactically, in ways that determine how their meanings will be understood. For example, "man bites dog" and "dog bites man" use the same set of words but because of their ordering will be understood by speakers of English as denoting very different meanings.

One of Terrace's colleagues, Laura-Ann Petitto, estimated that with more standard criteria, Nim's true vocabulary count was closer to 25 than 125. However, other students who cared for Nim longer than Petitto disagreed with her and with the way that Terrace conducted his experiment. Critics assert that Terrace used his analysis to destroy the movement of ape-language research. Terrace argued that none of the chimps were using language, because they could learn signs but could not form them syntactically as language.

Terrace and his colleagues concluded that the chimpanzee did not show any meaningful sequential behavior that rivaled human grammar. Nim's use of language was strictly pragmatic, as a means of obtaining an outcome, unlike a human child's, which can serve to generate or express meanings, thoughts or ideas. There was nothing Nim could be taught that could not equally well be taught to a pigeon using the principles of operant conditioning. The researchers therefore questioned claims made on behalf of Washoe, and argued that the apparently impressive results may have amounted to nothing more than a "Clever Hans" effect, not to mention a relatively informal experimental approach.

Critics of primate linguistic studies include Thomas Sebeok, American semiotician and investigator of nonhuman communication systems, who wrote:

Sebeok also made pointed comparisons of Washoe with Clever Hans. Some evolutionary psychologists, in effect agreeing with Chomsky, argue that the apparent impossibility of teaching language to animals is indicative that the ability to use language is an innately human development.

Objections
Terrace's skeptical approach to the claims that chimpanzees could learn and understand sign language led to heated disputes with Allen and Beatrix Gardner, who initiated the Washoe Project. The Gardners argued that Terrace's approach to training, and the use of many different assistants, did not harness the chimpanzee's full cognitive and linguistic resources.

Roger Fouts, of the Washoe Project, also claims that Project Nim was poorly conducted because it did not use strong enough methodology to avoid comparison to "Clever Hans" and efficiently defend against it. He also shares the Gardners' view that the process of acquiring language skills through natural social interactions gives substantially better results than behavioral conditioning. Fouts argues, based on his own experiments, that pure conditioning can lead to the use of language as a method mainly of getting rewards rather than of raising communication abilities. Fouts later reported, however, that a community of ASL-speaking chimpanzees (including Washoe herself) was spontaneously using this language as a part of their internal communication system. They have even directly taught ASL signs to their children (Loulis) without human help or intervention. This means not only that they can use the language but that it has become a significant part of their lives.

The controversy is still not fully resolved, in part because the financial and other costs of carrying out language-training experiments with apes make replication studies difficult to mount. The definitions of both "language" and "imitation" as well as the question of how language-like Nim's performance was has remained controversial.

Retirement and death
When Terrace ended the experiment, Nim was transferred back to the Institute for Primate Studies in Oklahoma, where he struggled to adapt after being treated like a human child for the first decade of his life. He had also never previously met another chimp and had to get used to them.

When Terrace made his one and only visit to see Nim after a year at the Institute of Primate Studies, Nim sprung to Terrace immediately after seeing him, visibly shaking with excitement. Nim also showed the progress he had made during Project Nim, as he immediately began conversing in sign language with Terrace. Nim retreated back to a depressed state after Terrace left, never to return to see Nim again. Nim developed friendships with several of the workers at the Institute of Primate Studies, and learned a few more signs, including a sign named "stone smoke time now" which indicated that Nim wanted to smoke marijuana.

The Institute later sold Nim to the Laboratory for Experimental Medicine and Surgery in Primates (LEMSIP), a pharmaceutical animal testing laboratory managed by NYU. At LEMSIP, Nim was confined to a wire cage, slated to be used for hepatitis vaccine studies. Technicians caring for the chimps noted that Nim and other chimps from the Institute continued to make sign-language gestures. After efforts to free him, Nim was purchased by the Black Beauty Ranch, operated by The Fund for Animals, the group led by Cleveland Amory, in Texas. While Nim's quality of life improved at the Black Beauty Ranch, Nim lived primarily in isolation inside a pen. He began to show hostility that included throwing TVs and killing a dog. Nim's behavior and overall well-being improved when other chimpanzees, several from the LEMSIP, joined Nim inside his pen after about a decade at the Black Beauty Ranch. Nim continued to show signs of the sign language he learned decades ago whenever a former trainer at the Institute for Primate Studies went to visit him.

Nim died on March 10, 2000, at the age of 26, from a heart attack.

Quotations
All quotations appear in the original article by Terrace and colleagues.

Three-sign quotations

 Apple me eat
 Banana Nim eat
 Banana me eat
 Drink me Nim
 Eat Nim eat
 Eat Nim me
 Eat me Nim
 Eat me eat
 Finish hug Nim
 Give me eat
 Grape eat Nim
 Hug me Nim
 Me Nim eat
 Me more eat
 More eat Nim
 Nut Nim nut
 Play me Nim
 Tickle me Nim
 Tickle me eat
 Yogurt Nim eat

Four-sign quotations

 Banana Nim banana Nim
 Banana eat me Nim
 Banana me Nim me
 Banana me eat banana
 Drink Nim drink Nim
 Drink eat drink eat
 Drink eat me Nim
 Eat Nim eat Nim
 Eat drink eat drink
 Eat grape eat Nim
 Eat me Nim drink
 Grape eat Nim eat
 Grape eat me Nim
 Me Nim eat me
 Me eat drink more
 Me eat me eat
 Me gum me gum
 Nim eat Nim eat
 Play me Nim play
 Tickle me Nim play

Longest recorded quotation
Nim's longest "sentence" was the 16-word-long "Give orange me give eat orange me eat orange give me eat orange give me you."

In media
Project Nim, a documentary film by James Marsh about the Nim study, explores the story (and the wealth of archival footage) to consider ethical issues, the emotional experiences of the trainers and the chimpanzee, and the deeper issues the experiment raised. This documentary (produced by BBC Films, Red Box Films, and Passion Films) opened the 2011 Sundance Film Festival. The film was released in theaters on July 8, 2011 by Roadside Attractions, and was released on DVD on February 7, 2012.

The story of Nim and other language-learning animals is told in Eugene Linden's book Silent Partners: The Legacy of the Ape Language Experiments.

Further reading

See also
 Alex (parrot)
 Chantek
 Kanzi
 Koko
 Lucy
 Panbanisha
 Jennie, a 1994 novel about a chimpanzee living with a family in the 1970s learning sign language
 List of individual apes

References

External links
 
 

Apes from language studies
1973 animal births
2000 animal deaths
Individual chimpanzees
Noam Chomsky